

Gustav Harteneck (27 July 1892 – 13 January 1984) was a German general  in the Wehrmacht during World War II. He was  a recipient of the Knight's Cross of the Iron Cross of Nazi Germany.

Awards and decorations

 Knight's Cross of the Iron Cross on 21 September 1944 as General der Kavallerie and commander of I. Kavallerie-Korps

References

Citations

Bibliography

 

1892 births
1984 deaths
People from Landau
People from the Palatinate (region)
German Army generals of World War II
Generals of Cavalry (Wehrmacht)
German Army personnel of World War I
Recipients of the clasp to the Iron Cross, 1st class
Recipients of the Gold German Cross
Recipients of the Knight's Cross of the Iron Cross
German prisoners of war in World War II held by the United Kingdom
20th-century Freikorps personnel
von Harteneck Family
Military personnel from Rhineland-Palatinate